Rev. Augustine Kirwan, D.D. (1724 – 7 August 1791), a descendant of one of The Tribes of Galway, Kirwan was Warden of Galway and Vicar of St. Nicholas's church. He had spent forty years as a minister, and founded the town's charity school. His nephew, Nicholas French, erected a monument over his grave as a mark of his respect in 1796.

See also

 William Ó Ciardhubháin

References
 History of Galway, James Hardiman, 1820

People from County Galway
1724 births
1791 deaths